MV-media, also known as MV??!!, formerly Mitä Vittua? The website publishes disinformation, pseudoscience and conspiracy theories with a racist, anti-immigrant, anti-Islam, anti-vaccine, pro-Russian and Eurosceptic agenda. The site has links to the far-right Soldiers of Odin. As of 2022, the publication is based in Russian-occupied Eastern Ukraine and regularly shares Russian state propaganda.

MV-lehti has been accused of racism and spreading fake news and hate speech. Due to this, Janitskin was suspected of several crimes, including incitement to ethnic or racial hatred, libel and copyright infringement, and was taken into custody by the Andorran police in August 2017. He was later extradited to Finland, and in October 2018, Janitskin was convicted of 16 offences and given a 22-month prison sentence. According to the court, Janitskin was the chief editor and owner of MV-lehti, and as such he was responsible for its content. Among the convictions were defamation of the journalist Jessikka Aro and two other women. Janitskin was likely to be spared from any more prison time, however, as he had been in custody and in home arrest for almost a year, and as a first-timer he would have been released after completing half of his sentence.

In January 2018, Janitskin left MV-media. The new owner, Juha Korhonen, said he would turn the website into a "cleaner" version. Since 2019 the editor in chief has been Janus Putkonen. Janitskin died of cancer in February 2020 at the age of 42. He had been appealing his convictions.

See also 
 List of fake news websites
 Magneettimedia

References 

2014 establishments in Finland
9/11 conspiracy theorists
Alternative medicine publications
Anti-vaccination media
Conspiracist media
Fake news websites
Finnish political websites
Internet properties established in 2014
Pseudoscience
Websites with far-right material